Alan Robinson is a former professional rugby league footballer who played in the 2000s. He played at representative level for Ireland, and at club level for Limoux Grizzlies and Coventry Bears.

Playing career

International honours
Alan Robinson won caps for Ireland while at Coventry Bears 2006 2-caps (World Cup Qualifiers sub vs Russia and Lebanon) He has also played for Ireland at A team level: 1996, 2002, 2003, 2004 Versus USA, 2006–08 in the Amateur Four Nations. He also played in two Student Rugby League World Cups in 1996 and 1999 and was the Great Britain and Ireland students captain in 1997.

Club career
He signed professional for French team Limoux Grizzlies in 2000 where he played one season before returning to England in 2001 to Coventry Bears the club which he founded in 1998.

References

Coventry Bears players
Ireland national rugby league team players
Limoux Grizzlies players
Living people
Place of birth missing (living people)
Year of birth missing (living people)
Irish expatriate rugby league players
Expatriate rugby league players in England
Expatriate rugby league players in France
Irish expatriate sportspeople in France
Irish expatriate sportspeople in England